Luther Wesley Singh (born 5 August 1997) is a South African professional soccer player who plays as a winger for Primeira Liga club Chaves, on loan from Danish club Copenhagen, and the South Africa national team.

Prior to making his senior international debut in 2017, Singh represented the South Africa national under-20 team, with whom he won the Golden Boot award at both the 2016 COSAFA Under-20 Championships and the 2017 Africa U-20 Cup of Nations.

Club career

Early career
Singh is an academy graduate of the famed South-African-based Stars of Africa football academy which he joined at the age of 11, after being scouted by Farouk Khan. Through the academy, Singh was afforded the opportunity to train in Brazil when he was 16 where he spent time with Vasco da Gama and Fluminense.

GAIS
Singh's success at the Stars of Africa academy caught the attention of numerous clubs and in 2015 Swedish second-division side GAIS signed him. In his first season with GAIS, Singh was employed as a winger and netted two goals in eight league appearances for the club before his season was cut short through injury. For the 2016 campaign, he was converted into a forward and scored the first professional hat-trick of his career on 22 May in a 7-0 win over Ängelholm. In July, the player confirmed that the Real Madrid B side and Swansea had previously been in contact with Khan, as his agent, over a potential transfer. GAIS rejected these advances, however, in a bid to hold on to Singh until his contract expired. In August of the same year, Singh rejected a move to Serie A side Pescara, claiming better options would become available to him once he was a free-agent. He ultimately made 28 appearances for the Superettan season and scored 9 goals as GAIS ended the campaign in eighth place.

Braga
Following the expiration of his contract with GAIS, Singh signed for Portuguese Primeira Liga side Braga on 21 January 2017. There, he teamed up with the club's reserve side who played in the LigaPro. He scored his first goal on 15 February 2017, netting the fifth in a 5–0 win over Vizela, and ultimately scored 14 goals in 52 appearances over the next season and a half.

Loan to Chaves
In January 2019, Singh joined fellow Primeira Liga side Chaves on loan for the remainder of the season. On 3 January, he made his debut for the club and was named man of the match for his performance in a 0–0 draw with Feirense. He scored his first goal in his third appearance for the club, netting the winner in a 2–1 league win over Tondela. He ultimately scored twice in seventeen appearances, but Chaves suffered relegation at the end of the campaign.

Loan to Moreirense
On 13 August 2019, he joined another Portuguese club Moreirense on a season-long loan.

Loan to Paços de Ferreira
On 21 September 2020, he joined another Portuguese club Paços de Ferreira on a loan.

Copenhagen
On 18 August 2021, Singh was picked up by perennial Danish frontrunner F.C. Copenhagen on a permanent transfer for an undisclosed fee. He made his debut on 22 August, coming on as a substitute for Mohamed Daramy in the 80th minute of a 2–0 win over SønderjyskE. In the UEFA Europa Conference League game against PAOK on 21 October, he came on as a half-time substitute, but was subbed off again before the final whistle. He was heavily criticized for his performance, with Danish commentators during the game saying that "he looks like someone who ate three burgers before coming onto the pitch". He was hospitalised in November 2021 after falling ill, something his agent later attributed to depression after being subject to criticism.

Singh joined former club Chaves on a season-long loan on 24 August 2022.

International career

South Africa U20
Singh represented South Africa at the 2016 COSAFA Under-20 Championships and scored in nation's 8-0 win over Lesotho during the group stage. After winning all three of their group stage matches, South Africa progressed to the semi-final where they beat Angola 5-0, with Singh netting a hat-trick on the day. South Africa lost in the final, however, with an assist from Singh not enough to prevent the nation going down 2-1 to Zambia. At the conclusion of the tournament Singh was awarded the Golden Boot award for his tally of five goals throughout the competition. He then represented South Africa at the 2017 Africa U-20 Cup of Nations and scored a hat-trick in the nation's opening match against Cameroon. He scored once more against Senegal before South Africa were eliminated from the competition in the semi-finals, losing out again to eventual champions Zambia. Singh's tally of four goals for the tournament, coupled with two assists earned him the Golden Boot award and a spot in the CAF Best XI. In May the same year, Singh was named in South Africa's 21-man squad for the 2017 FIFA U-20 World Cup in South Korea.

South Africa senior national team
Following his impressive performances at the Africa U-20 Cup of Nations, Singh was called up by interim manager Owen Da Gama to the senior national team in March 2018 for friendlies against Guinea-Bissau and Angola. Though an unused substitute in South Africa's 3–1 win over the former, he made his debut for the national team on 28 March against the latter, starting in a 0–0 draw. The following year he was named in Stuart Baxter's provisional squad for the 2018 COSAFA Cup before taking part in the 2019 edition where he scored his first international goals, against Botswana and Uganda respectively.

Personal life
Singh is of black South African and partial Indian descent, through his Punjabi Sikh grandfather, and was raised in the Noordgesig township in Soweto. His father, uncle and cousins all played football at an amateur or semi-pro level.

Career statistics

Club

International

Scores and results list South Africa's goal tally first, score column indicates score after each Singh goal.

Honours
Copenhagen
 Danish Superliga: 2021–22

South Africa U23
Africa U-23 Cup of Nations third place: 2019

Individual
 2016 COSAFA Under-20 Championships: Golden Boot
 2017 Africa U-20 Cup of Nations: Golden Boot
 2017 Africa U-20 Cup of Nations: Team of the Tournament

References

External links

1998 births
Living people
South African soccer players
South African expatriate soccer players
Association football forwards
South African people of Indian descent
Sportspeople of Indian descent
Sportspeople from Soweto
South Africa international soccer players
2019 Africa U-23 Cup of Nations players
South Africa under-20 international soccer players
Footballers at the 2020 Summer Olympics
Olympic soccer players of South Africa
GAIS players
S.C. Braga B players
G.D. Chaves players
Moreirense F.C. players
F.C. Paços de Ferreira players
F.C. Copenhagen players
Superettan players
Primeira Liga players
Liga Portugal 2 players
Expatriate footballers in Sweden
Expatriate footballers in Portugal
Expatriate men's footballers in Denmark
South African expatriate sportspeople in Sweden
South African expatriate sportspeople in Portugal
South African expatriate sportspeople in Denmark